WGSP-FM (102.3 MHz) is a radio station licensed to the community of Pageland, South Carolina, and serving the greater Charlotte, North Carolina, area.  The station is owned by Norsan Broadcasting of Atlanta, Georgia. It airs a Tropical music / Latin Pop format.

History
WCPL-FM was located in Pageland, South Carolina. In 1989, the station became WMAP-FM and began airing the same programming as WMAP in Monroe, North Carolina. After WMAP went off the air, the FM, later known as WRML, played Southern gospel music. In 2006, Norsan took over the station and made plans to move the transmitter closer to the metropolitan area. The programming was also aired on WXNC, at 1060 AM and WGSP, at 1310 AM.
Charlotte listeners began receiving the stronger signal in September 2007.

The station was assigned the WGSP-FM call letters by the Federal Communications Commission on September 26, 2007.

On January 1, 2009, "La Raza" began airing on WOLS, which Norsan Media began leasing, and WGSP-FM simulcast WOLS for a short time before a switch to tropical music / Latin pop format.

As of 2013, WRML was called "Latina 102.3".

References

External links

GSP-FM
Regional Mexican radio stations in the United States
GSP-FM
Radio stations established in 1978